Julian Felix Engels (né Büscher; born 22 April 1993) is a German footballer who plays as a midfielder.

Before moving to North America for college, Engels played for VfL Bochum, SC Preußen Münster and Sportfreunde Lotte. He played college soccer for the Syracuse Orange and at club level with K–W United, before turning professional with MLS side D.C. United. Engels also played with LA Galaxy II and Cavalry FC before returning to Germany.

Career

Early career 

Prior to playing in the United States, Engels competed for both VfL Bochum and SC Preußen Münster.

In 2014, Engels joined the Syracuse Orange men's soccer program. During his freshman year, Engels became an immediate starter for the Orange. There, he earned All-ACC Second Team honors and was named to the ACC All-Freshman Team. Engels tallied his first collegiate assist on 27 September 2014 in a 1–0 win against the second-ranked Virginia. The assist to Skylar Thomas, gave the Orange a 1–0 win against Virginia.

Throughout his freshman season, Engels earned a reputation of being a set piece specialist. His assists in subsequent matches against Albany, Bucknell, Duke and Georgetown led to three game winning matches.

Engels returned to Syracuse for his sophomore season where he remain a key cog in the Orange lineup. Engels lead the team in assists and was second on the team in goals scored, en route to the program's first-ever college cup run. Engels played in and started in all 25 matches the Orange played in 2015.

D.C. United 

Engels was selected 11th overall in the 2016 MLS SuperDraft by D.C. United. He made his United debut on 23 February 2016, in a CONCACAF Champions League quarterfinal match against Queretaro F.C. On 1 March 2016, he scored his first professional goal in the return leg of the Champions League against Queretaro, in a 1–1 draw. Engels made his MLS debut on 6 March 2016 in a 4–1 loss at LA Galaxy, coming on for Luciano Acosta in the 75th minute. He scored his first MLS goal against Orlando City SC for D.C. United on 24 September 2016.

On 14 August 2017, Engels was loaned to the USL side, Rochester Rhinos for the remainder of the 2017 USL season.

On 28 November 2017, his contract option with United was declined.

LA Galaxy II 
On 15 March 2018, Engels signed with LA Galaxy II of the United Soccer League. He made his debut on 17 March 2018 in a 2–0 loss to the Colorado Springs Switchbacks. On 8 August 2018, his contract with LA Galaxy II was mutually terminated.

Cavalry FC 
On 13 February 2019, Engels signed with Canadian Premier League club Cavalry FC for the team and league's inaugural season.

He scored his first goal for Cavalry FC on 22 May 2019 versus Pacific FC in the Canadian Championship. Engels finished the season with six goals and four assists in all competitions, helping Cavalry finish first in both the spring and fall seasons and qualifying for the 2019 Canadian Premier League Finals. Engels was praised for his performance and listed as one of the best midfielders, and players, in the league.

Back to Germany 
On 1 February 2020, Engels returned to Germany, signing with Regionalliga side TuS Haltern.

Engels left Haltern to join Bonner SC in August 2020 on a deal until June 2021. Less than two weeks after signing, he suffered a serious injury, when he tore his posterior cruciate ligament and was set to be out for one year.

Personal life 
Engels was born in Soest, North Rhine-Westphalia and grew up in nearby Dülmen.

In addition to playing for Cavalry FC, Engels coached youth soccer with Calgary Chinooks Soccer Club.

In May 2021, he married Sarah Engels, taking on her maiden name.

Honours
Calvary FC 
 Canadian Premier League Finals: runners-up 2019
 Canadian Premier League (Regular season): Spring 2019, Fall 2019

References

External links 
 Syracuse Profile
 
 

1993 births
Living people
Association football midfielders
German footballers
Footballers from North Rhine-Westphalia
People from Dülmen
Sportspeople from Münster (region)
People from Soest, Germany
Sportspeople from Arnsberg (region)
German expatriate footballers
Expatriate soccer players in the United States
German expatriate sportspeople in the United States
Expatriate soccer players in Canada
German expatriate sportspeople in Canada
SC Preußen Münster players
Sportfreunde Lotte players
Syracuse Orange men's soccer players
K-W United FC players
D.C. United draft picks
D.C. United players
Rochester New York FC players
LA Galaxy II players
Cavalry FC players
TuS Haltern players
Bonner SC players
3. Liga players
Regionalliga players
USL League Two players
Major League Soccer players
USL Championship players
Canadian Premier League players